Barbora Krejčíková and Kateřina Siniaková defeated Anhelina Kalinina and Iryna Shymanovich in the final, 6–3, 6–1 to win the girls' doubles tennis title at the 2013 Wimbledon Championships. They would also win the senior title five years later.

Eugenie Bouchard and Taylor Townsend were the reigning champions, but Bouchard was no longer eligible to compete in junior tennis. Townsend chose not to defend her title, deciding instead to only compete in singles.

Seeds

  Barbora Krejčíková /  Kateřina Siniaková (champions)
  Belinda Bencic /  Petra Uberalová (semifinals)
  Elise Mertens /  İpek Soylu (quarterfinals)
  Doménica González /  Carol Zhao (quarterfinals)
  Ioana Ducu /  Nina Stojanović (semifinals)
  Louisa Chirico /  Alejandra Cisneros (first round)
  Katy Dunne /  Anastasiya Komardina (first round)
  Anhelina Kalinina /  Iryna Shymanovich (final)

Draw

Finals

Top half

Bottom half

References

External links

Girls' Doubles
Wimbledon Championship by year – Girls' doubles